Odebrecht is a surname; notable people with this surname include:

  (1835–1912), German immigrant and Brazilian entrepreneur
  (1894–1962), Brazilian engineer
  (born 1984), German cyclist
 Job Odebrecht (1892–1982), German general
 Marcelo Odebrecht (born 1968), Brazilian entrepreneur
 Norberto Odebrecht (1920–2014), Brazilian construction engineer, founder of Odebrecht S.A.
  (1889–1945), German philosopher
 Viola Odebrecht (born 1983), German woman footballer 

de:Odebrecht
pt:Odebrecht